Robert Chapman may refer to:

 Robert Chapman (cricketer) (born 1972), English cricketer
 Robert Chapman (pastor) (1803–1902), British evangelist
 Robert Chapman (died 1563), MP for Cambridge
 Robert Chapman (MP), MP for Kingston upon Hull
 Robert William Chapman (engineer) (1866–1942), Australian mathematician and engineer
 Robert William Chapman (scholar) (1881–1960), British editor and book collector
 Sir Robert Chapman, 1st Baronet (1880–1963), Conservative Member of Parliament
 Robert F. Chapman (1926–2018), U.S. court of appeals judge
 Robert Hett Chapman (1771–1833), president of the University of North Carolina
 Robert L. Chapman (1920–2002), American lexicographer
 Robert Chapman (academic) (1922–2004), New Zealand historian and political scientist
 Robert Chapman (playwright) (1919–2000), American playwright and drama professor
 Sir Robert Chapman, 2nd Baronet (1911–1987), British landowner

See also
 Rob Chapman (disambiguation)
 Robert William Chapman (disambiguation)
 Bert Chapman (disambiguation)